Saint-Alexis may refer to the following places in Canada:

 Saint-Alexis, Quebec, part of which was formerly Saint-Alexis-de-Montcalm
 Saint-Alexis-de-Matapédia, Quebec
 Saint-Alexis-des-Monts, Quebec

See also
 
 Alexis (disambiguation)
 Sant'Alessio (disambiguation)
 Alexius of Rome, or Saint Alexis